Dunlow is an unincorporated community in southern Wayne County, West Virginia, United States, on Twelvepole Creek. It was laid out as a railroad town along the Ohio Extension of the Norfolk and Western Railway in 1892. Dunlow was incorporated in 1892. However, the railroad up the West Fork of Twelvepole Creek through Dunlow was shut down in the early 1930s, and what is left of the town is currently unincorporated. At the 2000 census, Dunlow had a population of 1,105. In 2009, the population was listed as 961.

Dunlow is noted for its wildlife sightings. There have been several accounts of sightings of black panthers and other jungle animals in Dunlow. A circus train that derailed in the mid-1940s, from which several jungle creatures escaped and were never recovered, is rumored to be the source of these animals.

Cities and towns located near Dunlow
 Breeden (8.2 miles)
 Crum (9.2 miles)
 Genoa (7.3 miles)
 Kiahsville (3.9 miles)
 Ranger (11.3 miles)
 Wilsondale (5.8 miles)
 Cove Gap (6.3 miles)
 Doane (3.4 miles)
 Quaker (4.7 miles)
 Upper Tug, Kentucky (9.0 miles)

Climate
The climate in this area is characterized by hot, humid summers and generally mild to cool winters.  According to the Köppen Climate Classification system, Dunlow has a humid subtropical climate, abbreviated "Cfa" on climate maps.

References

Further reading
 Jack Dickinson and Martha Kay Stamper, Last Train to Dunlow, History from the Hollows of Wayne County, West Virginia and the Coming of the N&W Railroad 1870-1940

 Jack and Kay have completed a Five Volume Set not just the first volume (Last Train to Dunlow); but also 4 more equally enjoyable volumes including: Murder Along the Tracks; Better Take Two Guns; Trail of the Powhatan Arrow; and, One more which title escapes my old mind at the moment.
All 5 volumes have lots of photos and are well-documented reflections on who we were and how the river, rails, hills & hollers shaped our lives of poverty, pain, suffering, and yet with few exceptions simply the most welcoming and kindest neighbors and "FOLKS" to know or for a stranger to encounter.  Jack and Kay Loved it and Lived it in and about Crum and Dunlow.  Those two are well-educated, well-researched and superb audience-captivating writers. I recall receiving my copy and reading Last Train to Dunlow cover to cover in one sitting commencing about 6pm thru 6am with a few pit stops in between  These authors spent their youth through college years in Crum(Jack) and Dunlow (Martha Kay) and write about what THEY KNOW and what THEY LEARNED speaking with the locals and more old codgers, sweet grandmas, wheezing & coughing not-so-old coal miners, and rocking-chair professors from Roanoke to Williamson to Logan, to and over the grades and on thru the Dingess Tunnel of the Old Line; then up and down the Tug from Fort Gay thru tunnels 7 and counting up River thru 1 at Kermit an on past Williamson still again along the River Line.   Yet and utterly important, Kay and Jack made many a journey to Roanoke and to Huntington and elsewhere researching their materials in the Special Book Collections of Marshall University and in Seldom-Publicized files, photo, facts and unique items, held by The Norfolk & Southern Historical Division at Roanoke; and researching  countless newspaper historical files.  SO, if you can find them at all GRAB THESE BOOKS.  They're out of print now and all 5 of these fine local histories sold out within weeks as each separate volume of rolled off the presses.
 Dunlow, WV information at zipareacode.net
 Weather History for Dunlow, WV

Unincorporated communities in Wayne County, West Virginia
Unincorporated communities in West Virginia